A Texan is a person associated with Texas, US.

Texan may also refer to:

Aircraft
 T-6 Texan, World War II era training plane
 T-6 Texan II, airplane used by the United States Air Force for basic pilot training
 Fly Synthesis Texan, an Italian ultralight aircraft

Entertainment
 The Texan (fictional character), a character in Catch-22
 The Texans, 1938 film starring Joan Bennett and Randolph Scott
 The Texan (TV series), CBS TV series from 1958–1960 starring Rory Calhoun
 TexANS, a band featuring Maynard James Keenan

Sports

Current sports teams
 Houston Texans, National Football League (NFL) team based in Houston, Texas
 Tarleton State Texans and TexAnns, NCAA Division I athletic program representing Tarleton State University in Stephenville, Texas

Former sports teams and former names of sports teams
 Houston Texans, a 1974 World Football League team that became the Shreveport Steamer
 Dallas Texans (Arena), an Arena Football League team that played from 1990 to 1993
 Dallas Texans (NFL), an NFL team in 1952 
 The Dallas Texans, an American Football League team of 1960–1962 that became the Kansas City Chiefs
 San Antonio Texans, a Canadian Football League team that played during the 1995 season
Dallas Texans (AHA), 1941–1942 team in the American Hockey Association
Dallas Texans (USHL), 1945–1949 team in the United States Hockey League (1945–1951)

Transportation
Texan, Frisco Railway long distance train (St. Louis-Tulsa-Dallas)
Texan, Missouri Pacific long distance train (St. Louis-Little Rock-Dallas-Fort Worth)
Texan, Santa Fe long distance train (Los Angeles-Houston)

Other uses
 Texan (chocolate bar)
 Texan English
 , a US ship
 The Daily Texan, the student newspaper of the University of Texas at Austin

See also
 Texas (disambiguation)
 Texian
 Tejano

Language and nationality disambiguation pages